Hand signals or hand signaling may refer to;

 Hand signals used by cyclists and motorists to indicate intended actions
 Hand signals (pickleball) used by line judges and players
 Hand signaling (open outcry) used on financial trading floors
 U.S. Army hand and arm signals used during radio silence